William Harrison may refer to:

Politicians
 William Harrison (Canadian politician) (1834–1922), saddlemaker, historian and reeve of Richmond Hill, Ontario
 William Harrison (MP) (baptised 1619 –1643), English Member of Parliament and Royalist soldier
 William Harrison Jr. (c. 1750–1789), delegate for Maryland in the U.S. Continental Congress of 1786 and 1787
 William A. Harrison (1795–1870), Virginia politician, West Virginia founder and Supreme Court Justice
 William Alistair Harrison (born 1954), Governor of Anguilla
 William B. Harrison (1889–1948), mayor of Louisville, Kentucky
 William C. Harrison, chairman of North Carolina board of education
 William H. Harrison (Wyoming politician) (1894–1991), Wyoming politician in the state house of representatives
 William Henry Harrison (1773–1841), ninth president of the United States
 William Henry Harrison III (1896–1990), American politician who served as a Republican U.S. representative from Wyoming
 William Henry Harrison (Canadian politician) (1880–1955), Canadian politician in the Legislative Assembly of New Brunswick
 William Henry Harrison (Georgia politician) (fl. 1843–1871), state legislator from Hancock County, Georgia
 William Henry Harrison (New Zealand politician) (1831–1879), New Zealand politician
 Bill Harrison (politician), mayor of Fremont, California

Sportsmen
 William Harrison (cricketer, born 1838) (1838–1912), English cricketer and British Army officer
 William Harrison (cricketer, born 1875) (1875–1937), English cricketer and High Sheriff of Staffordshire
 William Harrison (footballer, born 1858), English footballer 
 William Harrison (Welsh footballer) (1872–?), Wrexham F.C. and Wales international footballer
 William Hendy Harrison (1863–1939), English cricketer
 William Henry Harrison (cricketer) (1866–1936), English cricketer
 Bill Harrison (ice hockey), American ice hockey coach
 Billy Harrison (Australian footballer) (1884–1964), Australian rules footballer
 Billy Harrison (footballer, born 1886) (William Ewart Harrison, 1886–1948), English football player
 Billy Harrison (footballer, born 1901) (William Harrison, 1901–1984), English football player
 Billy Harrison (rugby league) (William Rapihana Harrison), rugby league footballer of the 1960s for New Zealand, and Wellington
 Will Harrison (rugby union) (born 1999), Australian fly-half

Clergymen
 William Harrison (Archpriest of England) (c. 1553–1621), English Roman Catholic priest
 William Harrison (bishop) (1837–1920), Anglican bishop
 William Harrison (priest) (1534–1593), English clergyman
 William P. Harrison (1830–1895), Methodist minister and theologian, Chaplain of the United States House of Representatives

Servicemen
 William Harrison (sea captain) (1812–1860), British merchant navy officer
 William H. Harrison (USMC) (1896–1955), United States Marine Corps general
 William Hardin Harrison (born 1933), retired U.S. Army lieutenant general
 William Kelly Harrison (1870–1928), U.S. Navy officer and Medal of Honor recipient
 William Kelly Harrison Jr. (1895–1987), U.S. Army officer
 William Leeming Harrison (1897–1960), Canadian fighter ace in World War I

Businessmen
 William B. Harrison Jr. (born 1943), former chairman and CEO of JP Morgan Chase
 William Henry Harrison (businessman) (1892–1956), American general and businessman
 William Welsh Harrison, American businessman

Writers
 William Harrison (antiquary) (1802–1884), English antiquarian writer on the history of the Isle of Man
 William Harrison (author) (1933–2013), author of "Roller Ball Murder" and the screenplay for Rollerball
 William Harrison (poet) (1685–1713), English poet and diplomat

Other
 William Harrison (instrument maker) (1728–1815), son of John Harrison, inventor of the chronometer
 William Harrison (physician) (1935–2010), American obstetrician
 William Harrison (singer) (1813–1868), English tenor and opera impresario
 William B. Harrison (Alamo defender) (1811–1836), Texas soldier
 William Greer Harrison (1836–1916), member of the Committee of Fifty after the 1906 San Francisco earthquake
 William Jerome Harrison (1845–1908), British geologist, science writer, and amateur photographer
 William Henry Harrison (architect) (1897–1988), American architect in California
 "Victim" of a 1660 murder found alive two years later; see The Campden Wonder
 Grancer Harrison (1789–1860), plantation owner whose alleged ghost has been the subject of several stories

See also
 William Henry Harrison (disambiguation)